The 2015 London ePrix, officially known as the 2015 Visa London ePrix, was two Formula E motor races that took place on the 27 and 28 June 2015 on the Battersea Park Street Circuit in Battersea Park, London. It was the tenth and eleventh rounds of the 2014–15 Formula E season, the last of the inaugural season of Formula E.

Background to race weekend 
In December 2013, the FIA approved a Formula E calendar of ten races, of which London was the 10th and last race. Wandsworth Council eventually approved of the circuit and also announced that it would be a double race on the 19 February 2015.

There was some controversy over the park circuit which took place in a Grade II* listed park with opposition to a public park being disrupted to accommodate the races. Battersea Park was closed to the public for four days with a three-week disruption period and a decision has yet to be taken on a repeat race.

Since the previous ePrix in Moscow, five driver changes were made. The first of these was that Jaime Alguersuari had been replaced by Fabio Leimer, as the Spaniard was forced to withdraw due to health issues. He was the first of three new Swiss drivers (taking the total 4), with Alex Fontana and Simona de Silvestro replacing Vitantonio Liuzzi and Justin Wilson respectively. De Silvestro's appearance in Formula E makes her the eighth driver to drive for Andretti this season, the sixth in the second car, and the third female driver in series history. Also making their first appearance was Sakon Yamamoto, who replaces António Félix da Costa as the Portuguese driver is driving for BMW in DTM, and Oliver Turvey, who replaces Charles Pic, becoming the fourth different driver to drive the second car for NEXTEV Team China Racing.

Race One

Background to Race One 
After winning the last race in Moscow, Nelson Piquet Jr. led the world championship by 17 points to fellow countryman, Lucas di Grassi. Swiss driver Sébastien Buemi was six points behind di Grassi in third. e.dams Renault topped the teams' championship by 44 points to Audi Sport Abt. NEXTEV Team China Racing was third, 11 further behind Audi Sport Abt.

After exceeding the track limits on multiple occasions in Moscow, Jarno Trulli was handed a five place grid penalty for failing to slow after cutting the chicane.

Qualifying 

 – Jarno Trulli was handed a five place penalty for excessive corner cutting in Moscow.

Race

Three points for pole position.
Two points for fastest lap.
 Salvador Duran received a drive through penalty converted into a 49-second penalty for overuse of power.

Standings after the race
Drivers or teams listed in bold were still able to take the respective title.

 Note: Only the top five positions are included for both sets of standings.

Race Two

Qualifying

Race
Sarrazin won the race from pole, but he was penalized post-race for overusing his allocated energy, handing Bird victory in his home race. Piquet Jr., meanwhile finished seventh and became Formula E's inaugural drivers' champion by one point ahead of Buemi, after the Swiss driver spun on his out lap after changing cars and stuck behind fourth-placed Senna for the remainder of the race, but nevertheless, e.dams secured their inaugural team's championship title.

Notes:
 – Two points for fastest lap.
 – Stéphane Sarrazin received a drive through penalty converted into a 49-second penalty for overuse of power.
 – Three points for pole position.

Standings after the race

 Note: Only the top five positions are included for both sets of standings.

References 

|- style="text-align:center"
|width="35%"|Previous race:2015 Moscow ePrix
|width="30%"|FIA Formula E Championship2014–15 season
|width="35%"|Next race:2015 Beijing ePrix2015–16 season
|- style="text-align:center"
|width="35%"|Previous race:-
|width="30%"|London ePrix
|width="35%"|Next race:2016 London ePrix
|- style="text-align:center"

London ePrix
London ePrix
London ePrix
ePrix
London ePrix